The Panzano Observatory was an observatory in the village of  about  to the NNW of the centre of the comune of Castelfranco Emilia, near Bologna, Italy, where Giovanni Cassini worked. It was built in the early 1640s by Cornelio Malvasia.

See also
 List of astronomical observatories

References

External links
Giovanni Domenico CASSINI, De cometa Anni 1652 & 1653, Mutinae 1653 (Italian)
Visita guidata al Castello Malvasia di Panzano di Castelfranco Emilia (MO) (Italian)

Astronomical observatories in Italy
Buildings and structures in Bologna
Giovanni Domenico Cassini